Galloway and Upper Nithsdale was a county constituency which returned one Member of Parliament (MP) to the House of Commons of the Parliament of the United Kingdom, elected by the first past the post voting system.

The constituency was created for the 1983 general election (partly replacing the former Galloway constituency), and abolished for the 2005 general election, when it was replaced by Dumfries and Galloway.

The constituency was notable in being the only seat in all of Scotland won by the Conservative Party at the 2001 general election, and was one of the very few seats that changed hands in that election.

Boundaries
1983–1997: Stewartry District, Wigtown District, and the Nithsdale District electoral divisions of Kirkconnel, Mabie, Mid Nithsdale, and Sanquhar and Queensberry.

1997–2005: Stewartry District, Wigtown District, and the Nithsdale District electoral divisions of Queensberry, Upper Nithsdale, and West Nithsdale.

Members of Parliament

Election results

Elections of the 1980s

Elections of the 1990s

Elections of the 2000s

References 

Historic parliamentary constituencies in Scotland (Westminster)
Constituencies of the Parliament of the United Kingdom established in 1983
Constituencies of the Parliament of the United Kingdom disestablished in 2005